Jen Vaughn (born 1983 in Oklahoma) is an  American comic book creator, editor and producer, best known for her work comics, both on licensed titles such as Adventure Time and Goosebumps and on original titles such as Cartozia Tales, as well as their tabletop role-playing game themed podcasting.

Personal life
Vaughn earned an M.F.A. in 2010 from the Center for Cartoon Studies. She currently lives in Washington, where she shares a studio with  Moritat, Brian Thies, and Stefano Guarino.

Comic book credits
 Adventure Time: 2013 Spoooktacular - writer/artist
 Adventure Time Sugary Shorts - writer/artist
 Cartozia Tales - writer/artist
 Princeless - writer/artist 
 Defend Comics - writer/artist 
 Avery Fatbottom: Renaissance Fair Detective - writer/artist
Effigy - artist (Vertigo comics, 2015)
Goosebumps: Download and Die -  writer (IDW, 2018)

Podcasting/Table Top Role Playing Games 
Vaughn is a host of the podcast D20 Dames and has published a playable Dungeons and Dragons module, The Experiments of Dr. Skulldial, based on the podcast.

Film credits
 Cartoon College (2012) - Cast

References

External links
https://www.hauntedvaultstudios.com - official website
D20 Dames - Podcast 
The Experiments of Doctor Skulldial - Dungeons and Dragons module

American women cartoonists
American female comics artists
American comics writers
Female comics writers
Living people
1983 births
American cartoonists
21st-century American women